Fernando de Barrionuevo, O.F.M. (died 1571) was a Roman Catholic prelate who served as Bishop of Santiago de Chile (1566–1571).

Biography
Fernando de Barrionuevo was ordained a priest in the Order of Friars Minor.
On 11 Nov 1566, he was appointed during the papacy of Pope Pius V as Bishop of Santiago de Chile.
In Dec 1569, he was consecrated bishop. 
He served as Bishop of Santiago de Chile until his death on 26 Jul 1571.

References 

16th-century Roman Catholic bishops in Chile
Bishops appointed by Pope Pius V
1571 deaths
Franciscan bishops
Roman Catholic bishops of Santiago de Chile